Vikrant Massey is an Indian actor who appears in Hindi television, Hindi films, and web series. He made his acting debut with the role of Aamir Hassan in Dhoom Machaao Dhoom and became a household name with his roles of Dharam in Dharam Veer, Murli Laal in Baba Aiso Varr Dhoondo and Ayaan Ahmed Khan in Qubool Hai.

After his huge success on Hindi television, Massey made his film debut with Lootera (2013) and appear in supporting parts in films including Dil Dhadakne Do (2015) and Half Girlfriend (2017). He earned critical acclaim for his lead portrayals in A Death in the Gunj (2017) and Chhapaak (2020). In the meantime, he also gained great appreciation with his starring roles in the popular web series  Mirzapur (2018) and Broken But Beautiful (2018–2019).

Vikrant went on to appear in acclaimed film projects such as the romantic comedy Dolly Kitty Aur Woh Chamakte Sitare (2020) and the mystery thriller Haseen Dillruba (2021).

Early life
Vikrant Massey was born to his parents Jolly and Meena. Belonging to a middle-class family, he was born and raised by his parents in Nagbhid, a small town in the Vidarbha region of Maharashtra. He was raised a Roman Catholic and he has one older brother Mohsin. His paternal family follows Christianity and his maternal family follows Sikhism.

Massey's educational background consists of attending St. Anthony’s High School in Versova with further studies being completed from R. D. National College of Arts & Science in Bandra, Mumbai. Being a well-trained dancer, he forayed onto stage with small-time dancing and theatre performances at the age of 7. With support and guidance from his teachers and school principal, he took up performing arts as a career choice at quite a young age. During his leisure period, he enjoys traveling, playing cricket, and video games.

Personal life
Massey and Sheetal Thakur began dating in 2015, before they together starred in the web series Broken But Beautiful. They got engaged in November 2019. They registered their marriage on 14 February 2022 in an intimate ceremony at their Versova home. On 18 February 2022, they got married in a traditional Hindu Marriage Ceremony.

Career

Massey is also a trained modern contemporary or modern jazz dancer and has worked with Shiamak Davar, and was a choreographer on his show Dhoom Machaao Dhoom. 

He played the role of Shyam Madan Singh in the television show Balika Vadhu on Colors TV which also starred Vibha Anand and was a success. He later played the lead role in Nikhil Sinha and Rakesh Paswan's Baba Aiso Varr Dhoondo on NDTV Imagine as Murli, husband of Bharti. He has also acted in Disney Channel India's Dhoom Machaao Dhoom, Star Plus's Kahaan Hoon Main which did not go on air, and the role of Dharam in NDTV Imagine's Dharam Veer.

Vikrant portrayed Ayaan Ahmed Khan, one of the lead roles in Zee TV's series Qubool Hai after replacing Rishabh Sinha.

Massey made his Bollywood debut in Vikramaditya Motwane's Lootera (2013), along with Ranveer Singh and Sonakshi Sinha. His first lead role was in Konkana Sen Sharma's debut directorial venture A Death in the Gunj. The film as well as his performance won critical acclaim. Rajeev Masand described his performance as a heartfelt one. For this performance, he received a nomination for Filmfare Critics Award for Best Actor.

He has been a part of various television commercials such as Zatak Deo, Cadbury, FINOLEX LED, Nescafe, Khazana Jewels, Samsung Galaxy, Cornetto, and Idea 4G.

Massey has also worked in various web series that includes Mirzapur, Broken But Beautiful, Criminal Justice directed by Tigmanshu Dhulia and Vishal Furia and Made In Heaven a web series on two wedding planners in Delhi running an agency named Made in Heaven. Vikrant Massey was paired with Shweta Tripathi in a science fiction film called Cargo written and directed by Arati Kadav. Cargo premiered at the 2019 MAMI Film Festival under the spotlight section<ref>{{cite web |title=Vikrant Massey, Shweta Tripathis Cargo at Jio MAMI film fest |url=https://www.outlookindia.com/newsscroll/vikrant-massey-shweta-tripathis-cargo-at-jio-mami-film-fest/1636641 |website=www.outlookindia.com/}}</ref> and on Netflix on 9 September 2020.

In 2020, he was seen opposite Deepika Padukone in Meghna Gulzar's Chhapaak. He appeared opposite Yami Gautam in Ginny Weds Sunny'', directed by debutant Puneet Khanna, produced by Vinod Bachchan, and released on Netflix.

Filmography

Films

Television

Web series

Short films

Accolades

References

External links

 
 
 
 

1987 births
Living people
Indian male television actors
Indian choreographers
Indian Christians
Male actors in Hindi cinema